Siege of Saragossa may refer to:

Siege of Saragossa (1808), in which the city's inhabitants resisted the French during the Peninsular War
Siege of Saragossa (1809), in which the city fell to the French

See also
Battle of Saragossa, a 1710 battle in the War of Spanish Succession